= Lansigama =

Village in North Western Province, Sri Lanka

Coordinates: 7°23′N 79°50′E

Lansigama is a village located near the coastal area of North Western Province in Sri Lanka.

The name Lansigama originated in the early 19th century due to the large number of mixed raced Sinhalese Portuguese ethnic descendants who used to live in this area. It derives from the Sinhalese "Lansi", (meaning "white people" from Sinhala "Landesi" meaning Dutch, from Português "Holandês"), and "gama", village.
